Burnin is a live album by American saxophonist Sonny Stitt, recorded in 1958 in Chicago but not released on Argo until 1960.

Released as part of the CD by Sonny Stitt and Friends as How High the Moon on Chess GRP18172, which adds tracks with other groups led by Stitt from 1964 and 1965. It can be found on the twofer Sonny Stitt / Burnin, issued by Fresh Sounds in 2009 or on the twofer Breaking It Up (Harris Trio)/Burnin''' by Jazz Beat Spain

Track listingAll pieces by Sonny Stitt, unless otherwise indicated.''

"Ko-Ko" (Charlie Parker) - 4:00
"A Minor Sax" - 4:08
"Lover Man" (Jimmy Davis, James Sherman, Roger Ramirez) - 3:52
"Reed and a Half" - 3:28
"How High the Moon" (Morgan Lewis, Nancy Hamilton) - 4:48
"I'll Tell You Later" - 4:24
"Look for the Silver Lining" (Jerome Kern, Buddy G. DeSylva) - 4:30
"Easy Living" (Leo Robin, Ralph Rainger) - 4:02
"It's Hipper Than That" - 4:46

Personnel
Sonny Stitt - alto saxophone or tenor saxophone 7 and 8
Barry Harris - piano
William Austin - bass
Frank Gant - drums

References

External links
 Burnin' at Discogs

Argo Records albums
Sonny Stitt albums
1960 albums